Tingey is a surname. Notable people with the surname include:

Albert Tingey Sr. (1869–1953), British golfer
Martha H. Tingey (1857–1938), American Mormon leader
Thomas Tingey (1750–1829), United States Navy commodore